Sydney M. Irmas (July 27, 1925 – August 29, 1996) was an American attorney, investor, philanthropist and art collector.

Early life
Sydney M. Irmas was born on July 27, 1925 in Los Angeles, California. His father, Sydney M. Irmas Sr., was the founder and Chairman of Slavick Jewelry Co. He had a brother, Richard Irmas, and a sister, Jon Lappen. His ancestors settled on Santa Catalina Island in the 1880s. His mother graduated from the University of Southern California in 1917.

Irmas graduated from the University of California, Los Angeles (UCLA) and received a law degree from the USC Gould School of Law in 1955.

Career
Irmas was an attorney and an investor. Shortly after graduation, he co-founded a law practice with attorney William Rutter until 1975. He practised the law for ten more years at Irmas, Simsky, Chudos, Green, Lasher & Hecht until 1985. He represented the comedian Lenny Bruce, the heiress Patty Hearst, attorney Melvin Belli, etc.

Philanthropy
Irmas served on the committee of the Los Angeles Family Housing Corporation, which provides housing for the homeless in Los Angeles. He also made charitable gifts to the Hollywood Sunset Free Clinic, which provided free healthcare to the homeless. Additionally, the Sydney M. Irmas Transitional Living Center in North Hollywood, through the LA Family Housing, is named in his honor. It offers 260 beds for up to 24 months to families who are temporarily homeless.

Irmas endowed programs for underprivileged youths in South Central and Canoga Park.

Art collection
With his wife, he was a collector of modern art. Their collection included photographs by Alphonse Louis Poitevin, Berenice Abbott, Piet Zwart, Peter Keetman, Robert Mapplethorpe, Andy Warhol, Lee Friedlander, Edward Steichen, Cindy Sherman, Yasumasa Morimura, Claude Cahun, Pierre Molinier, Roger Fenton, Francis Frith, etc. In 1992, they donated most of their collection to the Los Angeles County Museum of Art.

An exhibition of 140 of their donated works entitled The Camera I: Photographic Self-Portraits From the Audrey and Sydney Irmas Collection took place at the LACMA in 1994. Another exhibition, entitled Masquerade: Role Playing in Self-Portraiture—Photographs from the Audrey and Sydney Irmas Collection, took place from October 12, 2006 to January 7, 2007. A third exhibition, entitled Imagining the Modern Self: Photographs from the Audrey and Sydney Irmas Collection, took place from September 29, 2012 to January 21, 2013

Personal life
Irmas was married to Audrey Irmas, a philanthropist and art collector. They had two sons, Robert and Matthew, and a daughter, Deborah. They resided in Holmby Hills, Los Angeles, across the street from The Manor and Holmby Park.

Death and legacy
Irmas died of leukemia at the Cedars-Sinai Medical Center in Los Angeles in 1996. He was seventy-one years old. His funeral took place at Wilshire Boulevard Temple.

A year after his death, in 1997, the Audrey and Sydney Irmas Charitable Foundation donated US$1.5 million to endow the Sydney M. Irmas Chair in Public Interest Law and Legal Ethics at the University of Southern California. It is held by Professor Erwin Chemerinsky.

The Audrey and Sydney Irmas Campus of the Wilshire Boulevard Temple, a Reform synagogue in Los Angeles, was dedicated in 1998. It is located on the corner of Olympic and Barrington Boulevards in West Los Angeles.

References

1925 births
1996 deaths
People from Los Angeles
University of California, Los Angeles alumni
USC Gould School of Law alumni
American investors
Philanthropists from California
Jewish American philanthropists
American art collectors
American Reform Jews
Deaths from leukemia
Year of birth uncertain
People from Holmby Hills, Los Angeles
California lawyers
20th-century American lawyers
20th-century American Jews